The Irish state has officially approved the following List of National Monuments of Ireland. In Ireland, a structure or site may be deemed to be a "National Monument", and therefore worthy of state protection, if it is of national importance. If the land adjoining the monument is essential to protect it, this land may also be protected.

National Monuments in Leinster 

 This list is initially sorted by county. If the list is sorted under another heading, the county links above will take you to the first item from the county in the sorted list

|}

See also 

National Monument (Ireland)

References 

 National Monuments Service: Search By County. Retrieved 29 July 2010.

Archaeological sites in the Republic of Ireland
Monuments and memorials in the Republic of Ireland
Heritage registers in the Republic of Ireland